Inussulissuaq Island (old spelling: Inugsuligssuaq) is a small uninhabited island in the Melville Bay region of the Upernavik Archipelago in Avannaata municipality in northwestern Greenland. The name of the island means "a large cairn" in the Greenlandic language.

Geography 
There is a small freshwater lake on the southern coast.

Promontories

History 
Inussullissuaq Island has never been permanently inhabited due to its small size. In 1930 it briefly served as a polar station for Knud Rasmussen, the Greenlandic polar explorer and anthropologist. The station was named Bjørne Borg (or Bjørneborg, a bear castle). Its ruins can still be found on the island.

Settlement 
The island is accessible only by boat, and thus the distances to reach it are longer due to the need to navigate around the Kiatassuaq Island and Nuussuaq Peninsula, respectively.

References 

Inussulik Bay
Uninhabited islands of Greenland
Islands of the Upernavik Archipelago